The Tippecanoe Valley Athletic Conference was an IHSAA-sanctioned small-school conference in Fulton and Pulaski counties in northern Indiana. The conference formed as the Pulaski County Conference (earlier Athletic Association) in 1919, as all of the county schools outside of Winamac organized together.

The league expanded to add three Fulton County schools in 1955, and added three schools from Starke County its second year. However, by 1967 the league was down to four schools due to consolidation, and would close up shop after that season as three of those remaining schools were consolidated themselves.

Membership

 Played concurrently in TVAC and KVC 1956–57.
 played concurrently in TVAC and KVC 1956–59. 
 Played concurrently in TVAC and SLMC 1965–67.

References

Indiana high school athletic conferences
High school sports conferences and leagues in the United States
Indiana High School Athletic Association disestablished conferences